The McDonald's All American Game is the all-star basketball game played each year for American and Canadian boys' and girls' high school basketball graduates. Consisting of the top players, each team plays a single exhibition game after the conclusion of the high-school basketball season, in an East vs. West format. As part of the annual event, boys and girls compete in a slam dunk contest and a three-point shooting competition, and compete alongside All-American Game alumni in a timed team shootout. The last of these competitions replaced separate overall timed skills competitions for boys and girls. It is rare for girls to compete in the slam dunk contest. They have, however, won it three times—in 2004 by Candace Parker, in 2019 by Fran Belibi, and most recently in 2022 by Ashlyn Watkins. The boys' game has been contested annually since 1978, and the girls game has been played each year since it was added in 2002.

The McDonald's All-American designation began in 1977 with the selection of the inaugural team. That year, the All-Americans played in an all-star game against a group of high school stars from the Washington, D.C. area.  The following year, the McDonald's game format of East vs. West was begun with a boys contest. In 2002, with the addition of a girls contest, the current girl-game / boy-game doubleheader format began.

The McDonald's All-American Team is the best-known of the American high-school basketball All-American teams.  Designation as a McDonald's All-American instantly brands a player as one of the top high-school players in the United States or Canada. Selected athletes often go on to compete in college basketball. All but three of the teams  to win the NCAA men's championship since 1978 has had at least one McDonald's All-American on its roster.  The exceptions are the 2002 Maryland Terrapins, the 2014 Connecticut Huskies, and the 2021 Baylor Bears.

The teams are sponsored by the fast-food chain McDonald's.  Proceeds from the annual games go to local Ronald McDonald House Charities (RMHC) and their Ronald McDonald House programs.

Greatest Boys McDonald's All-Americans
On January 31, 2012, McDonald's All-American Games unveiled its list of 35 of the Greatest McDonald's All-Americans, released in celebration of the 35th Anniversary of the McDonald's All-American High School Boys Basketball Game. In 2017, five players were added to the list in celebration of the 40th Anniversary. Another five players were added in 2022 to celebrate the 45th Anniversary of the game.

The Greatest Boys McDonald's All-Americans list includes some of the top names in men's basketball history, and features past and present Olympics, NBA and NCAA stars. The players were selected by members of the McDonald's All-American Games Selection Committee. In determining the list, all past McDonald's All-Americans were considered based on their high school careers and performances in the McDonald's All-American Games, success at the collegiate and professional level, and post-career accomplishments. The full list of players includes:

Annual game results
An MVP/MOP award is presented each year to the most outstanding boy and girl players.  The award is officially called the John R. Wooden Most Valuable Player Award.

Boys

 Denotes All-Star Games in which joint winners were named

Girls

Notes

Morgan Wootten National Player of the Year
Prior to each game since 1997 (Boys)/2002 (Girls), a national player of the year has been chosen from the field of McDonald's All-Americans based on activity in the community, classroom and on the court. The award is named in honor of high school coach Morgan Wootten, one of the founders of the McDonald's game.

Past winners
Boys

 1997: Shane Battier
 1998: Ronald Curry
 1999: Jonathan Bender
 2000: Chris Duhon 
 2001: Aaron Miles
 2002: Torin Francis
 2003: LeBron James
 2004: Dwight Howard
 2005: Josh McRoberts
 2006: Greg Oden
 2007: Kevin Love
 2008: Greg Monroe
 2009: Derrick Favors
 2010: Harrison Barnes
 2011: Austin Rivers
 2012: Shabazz Muhammad
 2013: Jabari Parker
 2014: Jahlil Okafor
 2015: Ben Simmons
 2016: Lonzo Ball
 2017: Wendell Carter Jr.
 2018: RJ Barrett
 2019: James Wiseman
 2020: Evan Mobley
 2021: Chet Holmgren
 2022: Dereck Lively II

Girls

 2002: Nicole Wolff
 2003: Ivory Latta
 2004: Candace Parker
 2005: Abby Waner
 2006: Tina Charles
 2007: Maya Moore
 2008: Elena Delle Donne
 2009: Kelsey Bone
 2010: Chiney Ogwumike
 2011: Elizabeth Williams
 2012: Breanna Stewart
 2013: Taya Reimer
 2014: Ariel Atkins
 2015: Katie Lou Samuelson
 2016: Crystal Dangerfield
 2017: Evina Westbrook
 2018: Christyn Williams
 2019: Haley Jones
 2020: Paige Bueckers
 2021: Azzi Fudd
 2022: Kiki Rice

Sprite/Powerade Jam Fest Award Winners
The slam dunk contest was first held as an unofficial event in 1985, and became an official part of the festivities in 1987.

The three-point contest was first held for boys in 1989, with a girls' competition added alongside the inaugural girls' game in 2002.

The skills contest was added for both boys and girls in 2002, with separate events held for both sexes through 2015.

In 2016, the skills contest was discontinued and replaced with a "Legends & Stars Shootout", involving teams consisting of one boy, one girl, and one All-American Game alumnus of either sex. Within each individual entry of Legends & Stars Shootout winners, the teams are listed in the aforementioned order. The Shootout is a timed competition in which each team must make a layup, free throw, three-pointer, and halfcourt shot in that order.

Note: The only female winners of the slam dunk contest are Candace Parker, Fran Belibi, and Ashlyn Watkins who respectively won in 2004, 2019, and 2022.

References

External links
 
 McDonald's Boys All American Teams at Basketball-Reference.com

 
High school basketball games in the United States
Game
Recurring sporting events established in 1977
1977 establishments in the United States